Stefan Konrad Raab (born 20 October 1966) is a German television producer, businessman, and former entertainer and television host. From 1999 to 2015, he hosted the late-night comedy talk show TV total and has also created a number of other television shows, such as Schlag den Raab and Bundesvision Song Contest.

Raab began his TV career hosting the comedy show Vivasion in 1993. He became well known in 1994 after composing a hit single spoofing national football coach Berti Vogts. In the early 2010s, Raab was considered the "most powerful man in German entertainment television".

Raab is also known for his recurring role as producer, writer and performer of German entries to the Eurovision Song Contest between 1998 and 2012. He was the initiator of the national pre-selection show Unser Star für Oslo ("Our Star for Oslo"), in which Germany's winning entry at the 2010 contest in Oslo was determined. 

In 2015, Raab ended his career in front of the camera and started focusing entirely on production work.

Early life and family
Raab grew up in Cologne with his sister and their parents, who owned a butcher's shop. He attended Jesuit boarding school Aloisiuskolleg in Bonn. Before entering the entertainment business, he completed an apprenticeship as a butcher in his parents' shop and studied law before dropping out of university after five semesters. 

Raab lives in a suburb of Cologne and has two daughters (born 2004 and 2006) with his girlfriend Nike. Other than this, very little is known about Raab, who deliberately hides his private life from the media.

Career

Television 

Raab became popular in Germany as the host of the comedy show Vivasion for German music television channel VIVA from 1993 to 1998.

In 1999, he created TV total which began airing in April 2001 on ProSieben, four times a week. While TV total started as a comedy format mainly showing and satirizing funny and embarrassing sequences from other television programs, it soon came to be more of a late night show featuring musical performances—in some ways similar to The Tonight Show with Jay Leno or Late Night with Conan O'Brien.

After a boxing match against Regina Halmich in 2001 (rematch 2007) and a speed skating race against Claudia Pechstein in 2002, he also created several other celebrity sports events that are produced regularly, including TV total Turmspringen (high diving) and TV total Stock Car Crash Challenge (stock car racing). He also brought fun and variety to the show by invented new sports: In November 2003, he initiated the first "official" World Wok racing Championship in Winterberg, Germany. Modified Chinese woks are used to make timed runs down an Olympic bobsled track. The championship took place annually until March 2011, in Innsbruck. The first Autoball EM — Autoball being a version of football played in cars and using an exercise ball to score goals — took place in 2007.

In 2006, Raab invented the game show Schlag den Raab (German for "Beat the Raab", remade for British television as Beat the Star and as Beat Your Host in several other European countries), in which he competed against a contestant in various disciplines. Some episodes of the show lasted more than five hours with excellent ratings.

Raab frequently organizes PokerStars.de Nacht, a poker event featuring some celebrity names in German entertainment.

In September 2012, he announced that he would be hosting a new talk show on ProSieben which would include political guests. It began airing on 11 November 2012. It stood in direct competition with the self-titled talk show hosted by Günther Jauch.

In September 2013, Raab was one of four hosts (one from each big television network) at the federal election debate between chancellor Angela Merkel and her challenger Peer Steinbrück.

In mid-2015, Raab announced his retirement from television and stated that he would remain hosting until the end of the year. The last episode of his show TV total aired on 16 December and the last episode of Schlag den Raab aired on 19 December 2015.

Music

Raab began working as a freelance producer and composer of jingles and radio commercials in 1990 at his own studio in Cologne.

From 1994 onwards, he produced a number of popular songs, including "Böörti Böörti Vogts" (a song about Berti Vogts), "Hier kommt die Maus" ("Here comes the mouse", a tribute to the children's television series Die Sendung mit der Maus), "Maschen-Draht-Zaun", "Wir kiffen", "Gebt das Hanf frei!" ("Legalise Dope!", featuring Shaggy and samples from German politician Hans-Christian Ströbele), "Hol' mir ma' 'ne Flasche Bier" ("Get me a bottle o' beer", containing samples from then-chancellor Gerhard Schröder), and "Space Taxi" from the soundtrack of the film Traumschiff Surprise – Periode 1.

He wrote the song for the German entry to the Eurovision Song Contest 1998, Guildo Horn's "Guildo hat euch lieb!", and in the Eurovision Song Contest 2000 he took part himself, performing the nonsense song "Wadde hadde dudde da?". Raab cast the German entry for the 2004 Eurovision Song Contest in a talent show contest called SSDSGPS ("Stefan sucht den Super-Grand-Prix-Star", "Stefan seeks the super Grand-Prix star", satirising the title of the German Idol series Deutschland sucht den Superstar, DSDS). The winner, Max Mutzke, came in eighth place.

Bored with the Eurovision Song Contest, Raab came up with the Bundesvision Song Contest in 2005 (Bundesrepublik Deutschland = Federal Republic of Germany). The contest features representatives from each of the 16 states of Germany and stipulates that their song has to be at least partly in German.

In 2009, Raab was approached by the public broadcaster NDR, a member of the ARD broadcasting consortium, to jointly organise a national preselection in order to determine the German entry for the Eurovision Song Contest 2010. It was revealed that Raab initially refused the request, but that his television network ProSieben accepted the offer to work with ARD/NDR. As a result of the cooperation, the talent show contest Unser Star für Oslo (Our Star for Oslo) took place from 2 February 2010 onwards, stretching across 8 shows. Raab took a lead role in the programmes as head of the jury. In the national final on 12 March 2010, Lena Meyer-Landrut emerged as winner. On 29 May 2010, Meyer-Landrut won the Eurovision Song Contest 2010 with the song "Satellite", claiming the first German Eurovision victory in 28 years.

As a musician, Raab is an autodidact, playing various instruments, such as piano, drums, guitar, ukulele, and some wind instruments.

Participation at the Eurovision Song Contest

On 19 May 2011 Raab eventually ended his Eurovision involvement as a host, chairman of the jury, composer and musical producer.

TV shows

As host 
 1993–1998: Vivasion, VIVA
 1995–1996: Ma' kuck'n, VIVA
 1999–2015: TV total, ProSieben
 2005–2015: Bundesvision Song Contest, ProSieben
 2009, 2014–2015: Schlag den Star, ProSieben
 2011: Eurovision Song Contest, ARD
 2012–2013: TV total Quizboxen, ProSieben
 2012–2013: Absolute Mehrheit, ProSieben
 2013: Das TV-Duell – Merkel gegen Steinbrück, ProSieben

As candidate 

 2003–2015: TV total Wok-WM, ProSieben
 2004–2015: TV total Turmspringen, ProSieben
 2005–2015: TV total Stock Car Crash Challenge, ProSieben
 2006–2015: Schlag den Raab, ProSieben
 2008–2014: TV total Autoball, ProSieben
 2009–2015: Deutscher Eisfußball-Pokal, ProSieben

As producer 
 2009–present: Schlag den Star, ProSieben
 2018–present: Das Ding des Jahres, ProSieben
 2019: Headis Team-WM, ProSieben
 2019–present: 1:30, ProSieben
 2019–present: Schlag den Besten, ProSieben
 2020–present: Free European Song Contest, ProSieben

Awards
For his television show Vivasion, Raab received the Goldener Löwe (Golden Lion), the predecessor to Deutscher Fernsehpreis (German Television Award), in 1996. For TV total he received the Deutscher Fernsehpreis in 1999 as well as the comedy award Rose d'or in 2001.

For his talent show SSDSGPS he was awarded the Adolf-Grimme-Preis in 2005 in for the "discovery and support of young music talents". On 29 May 2005, Raab received the Deutsch-Türkischer Freundschaftspreis (German-Turkish Friendship Award) for his TV total specials from Istanbul in preparation for the Eurovision Song Contest 2004. He won the Bravo Otto in the category "Comedystar" from 2000 to 2003. In 2000 and 2005, Raab was awarded the ECHO (German music award) as "Best National Producer". In 2005, he also received the ECHO award as "media partner of the year").

On 29 September 2007, Raab received the Deutscher Fernsehpreis for "Best Entertainment Show" for the fifth episode of Schlag den Raab. On 6 February 2008, the show was awarded the Goldene Kamera (Golden Camera). Furthermore, Raab received the media award Bambi on 27 November 2008. In 2009, Raab won the Herbert Award 2009 for Best Television Sports show for TV total Turmspringen.

Madame Tussauds in Berlin has displayed a wax figure of Raab since April 2009.

As the initiator and president of the jury of the show Unser Star für Oslo, Raab was awarded the Bavarian TV Award in 2010.

On 12 November 2011, Raab came second in synchronised diving, teaming with Elton in Munich, at the TV Total Turmspringen 2011 event. This was his first ever podium along with Elton at this event.

Controversies
Raab has been the subject of lawsuits throughout his career, some of which have gained public attention. The two most referenced cases are:
The case of then 16-year-old model Lisa Loch, who was ridiculed during some shows through Raab's assertion that her name ("Loch" meaning "hole" in German) made her more likely to find a job as an actress in pornographic movies. Loch claimed she received anonymous obscene telephone calls, was mocked by classmates and in public and as a result suffered sleeplessness and was afraid to leave her home. A court in Hamm ordered Raab to pay €70,000 in compensation due to infringement of personal rights.
In an episode broadcast on 6 September 2004, Raab showed a clip, originally destined for a news broadcast, of a 28-year-old Turkish mother Nil S. holding a Schultüte (a cardboard cone, typically full of sweets, traditionally given to children in Germany on their first school day). Raab's comment, "Unbelievable! The drug traffickers are disguising themselves better and better" ("eine Tüte" also means "a marijuana joint" in German slang, hence the pun), resulted in repeated lawsuits, and after a Munich court ruled against Raab, Nil S. settled for €20,000 compensation accompanied by a written apology.

References

External links

 
 Official TV total website 

1966 births
Living people
Television people from Cologne
German male comedians
Eurovision Song Contest entrants for Germany
German comedy musicians
German game show hosts
Eurovision Song Contest entrants of 2000
German pop singers
Eurovision Song Contest conductors
Musicians from Cologne
Bundesvision Song Contest
21st-century conductors (music)
ProSieben people